The feldspathoids are a group of tectosilicate minerals which resemble feldspars but have a different structure and much lower silica content. They occur in rare and unusual types of igneous rocks, and are usually not found in rocks containing primary quartz. A notable exception where feldspathoids and quartz-bearing rocks are found together is the Red Hill Syenite.

Foid, a contraction of the term feldspathoid, is applied to any igneous rock containing up to 60% modal feldspathoid minerals. For example, a syenite with significant nepheline present can be termed a nepheline-bearing syenite or nepheline syenite, with the term nepheline replaceable by any foid mineral. Such terminology is used in the Streckeisen (QAPF) classification of igneous rocks.

Feldspathoid minerals

Sodalite Group

References

 
Tectosilicates